Mahavatar is an American progressive metal band from New York City. Former drummer, Eran Asias was in the band and contributed drums along with other groups from his country Israel including: Orphaned Land, Betrayer and Eternal Gray. To add to that, former guitarist Karla Williams is from Jamaica while former drummer Peter Lobodzinski is Polish.

Discography

Albums
 Go with the NO! (2005)
 From the Sun, the Rain, the Wind, the Soil (2006)

Demos and promos
 Promo 2000 Single (2000)	
 Demo 2000 Demo (2000)	
 Demo 2003 Demo (2003)

Members

Current
 Lizza Hason Demauro − Vocals,
 Richard Almady − Guitar, backing vocals
 Spectra Artceps − Bass
 Aidan Shepard − Drums
 Keisuke Furokubo - Guitar

Former
 Peter Lobodzinski − Drums (1999–2001)
 Benjamin Serf − Bass (1999–2000)
 Eddie Gasior − Bass (2000–2003)
 Itamar Ben-Zakay − Drums (2003)
 Roi Star − Drums (2005–2006)
 Eran Asias − Drums
 Karla Williams − Guitars

Session
 Miko − Keyboards
 T-Bone Motta − Drums
 DMD Death Metal Dave - Guitar

External links
 
 Mahavatar at MySpace
 [ Mahavatar] at Allmusic
 Mahavatar at MusicMight
 Reverbnation entry

Heavy metal musical groups from New York (state)
American progressive metal musical groups
Musical groups established in 1999
1999 establishments in New York City